Senza Volto is a French luchador enmascarado (masked professional wrestler) who is primarily known for his work in the German professional wrestling promotion Westside Xtreme Wrestling and in the European independent scene.

Professional wrestling career

European independent circuit (2014–present)
Volto is mainly known for his freelance work inside the European independent scene. He briefly competed for the Britiah promotion Revolution Pro Wrestling. He made his first appearance at RevPro Summer Sizzler 2019 on August 30, where he unsuccessfully competed in a six-way scramble match won by Sanada and also involving Hikuleo, Mike Bailey, Robbie Eagles and Rocky Romero. At RevPro Live At The Cockpit 45, an event promoted on September 1, 2019, Volto unsuccessfully challenged El Phantasmo for the Undisputed British Cruiserweight Championship. Besides wXw, the company for which he has worked many times is the German Wrestling Federation. At GWF Battlefield 2022 on September 25, he competed in a battle royal to determine the number one contender for the GWF World Championship won by Erik Sulcani and also involving Axel Tischer, John Klinger, Doug Williams and many others. Volto won the GWF Berlin Championship on two separate occasions and the GWF Tag Team Championship once with Oliver Carter.

Westside Xtreme Wrestling (2020–present)
Volto made his debut in Westside Xtreme Wrestling at wXw Shortcut To The Top on August 21, 2020, where he unsuccessfully challenged Metehan for the wXw Shotgun Championship. He continued to make sporadic appearances for the company and eventually formed the tag team of "Frenchadors" alongside Aigle Blanc, and began participating in tournaments to determine the number one contendership for the wXw World Tag Team Championship. Their first one was the one which started at wXw We Love Wrestling #5 on March 19, 2021, where they defeated The Arrows Of Hungary (Dover and Icarus), but fell short to The Pretty Bastards (Maggot and Prince Ahura) two nights later. Volto oftenly works in singles competition. At wXw We Love Wrestling #12 on May 14, 2021, he participated in a battle royal to determine the number one contender for the WXw Unified World Wrestling Championship won by Levaniel and also involving notable opponents such as Tristan Archer and Vincent Heisenberg. At Shortcut To The Top 2021 on July 30, Volto participated in the traditional 30-man match won by Jurn Simmons and also involving Bobby Gunns, Norman Harras, Robert Dreissker, Fast Time Moodo, Peter Tihanyi and others.

Personal life
In an interview from 2017, Volto cited Rey Mysterio and Ricochet as two of his biggest inspirations from the professional wrestling world. He also explained the origin of his ring name of Senza Volto meaning "no face" in Italian, as a reference to his luchador persona.

Championships and accomplishments

BodyZoi Wrestling
BodyZoi Championship (1 time)
Championship Of Wrestling
cOw/WPWI United Championship (1 time)
German Wrestling Federation
GWF Berlin Championship (2 times)
GWF Tag Team Championship (1 time) – with Oliver Carter
International Catch Wrestling Alliance
ICWA European Tag Team Championship (1 time) – with Ace Angel
 Pro Wrestling Illustrated
Ranked No. 262 of the top 500 singles wrestlers in the PWI 500 in 2022
Pro Wrestling Allstars
PWA DareDevil Championship (1 time)
Pro Wrestling Showdown
PWS Tag Team Championship (1 time) – with Mark Benjamin
Southside Wrestling Entertainment
SWE European Championship (1 time)
SWE Speed King Championship (1 time)
Tigers Pro Wrestling
TPW Tag Team Championship (1 time) – with Vince NT
Westside Xtreme Wrestling
wXw World Tag Team Championship (1 time, current) – with Aigle Blanc
World Tag Team Festival (2022) – with Aigle Blanc
WrestlingKULT
WrestlingKULT No Limits Championship (1 time)
Xperience Wrestling
Xperience Wrestling M Division Championship (1 time)

References

External links 
 
 

1993 births
Living people
21st-century professional wrestlers
French male professional wrestlers
Masked wrestlers
Unidentified wrestlers
People from Paris
Sportspeople from Paris